Robert Morris "Bobby" Morgan (born June 29, 1926) is an American former professional baseball infielder. He played eight seasons in Major League Baseball (MLB) between 1950 and 1958 for the Brooklyn Dodgers, Philadelphia Phillies, St. Louis Cardinals, and Chicago Cubs.

Born in Oklahoma City, Oklahoma, Morgan began his pro career in 1944, playing for two minor league teams before he was drafted for World War II military duty and spent the 1945–46 seasons in the United States Army, where he served in the European Theater of Operations. In 1949, he was named Most Valuable Player and All-Star shortstop of the Triple-A International League after he won the league batting crown (.337) and collected 112 runs batted in as a member of the Montreal Royals.

Morgan's days with the Dodgers were spent as a utility infielder, playing behind Hall of Famers Pee Wee Reese and Jackie Robinson, All-Star Gil Hodges, 1953 Rookie of the Year Jim Gilliam and slick-fielding Billy Cox. He played in three World Series games for the Dodgers. In the 1952 series he was a defensive replacement in game 4, and lined out as a pinch hitter in the ninth inning of Game 7 against Bob Kuzava of the New York Yankees. In the 1953 fall classic he again lined out as a pinch hitter, in the seventh inning of game 6.

Traded to the Phillies in March 1954, Morgan enjoyed his best big-league season that year, setting personal bests in hits (119), doubles, home runs (14), RBI (50) and batting average (.262) as the Phillies' starting shortstop, where he displaced veteran former "Whiz Kid" Granny Hamner. The following year, Morgan moved to second base, but slumped at the plate.

Overall, as a big-leaguer, Morgan collected 487 hits, with 96 doubles, 11 triples and 53 home runs. He batted .233.

Morgan's playing career continued in the minor leagues through 1963, he then managed for three seasons (1964–66) in the Phillie farm system and scouted for the Baltimore Orioles, Kansas City Royals and Minnesota Twins.

References

External links

Philadelphia Phillies players
St. Louis Cardinals players
1926 births
Living people
Baltimore Orioles scouts
Baseball players from Oklahoma
Brooklyn Dodgers players
Buffalo Bisons (minor league) players
Chattanooga Lookouts players
Chicago Cubs players
Kansas City Royals scouts
Major League Baseball infielders
Miami Marlins (FSL) players
Montreal Royals players
Newport News Dodgers players
Norfolk Tides managers
Olean Oilers players
Spokane Indians players
Sportspeople from Oklahoma City
International League MVP award winners
United States Army personnel of World War II